Peter George Rowles (born 18 November 1952) is an Australian former rugby union and professional rugby league footballer who played in the 1970s and 1980s. In union he represented Australia and in league he played in the NSWRFL Premiership for the Western Suburbs and Newtown clubs.

Son of record-breaking Manly-Warringah rugby league player Ron Rowles, Peter, a fly-half, was born in Wollongong, New South Wales and claimed a total of 2 international rugby caps for Australia.

Peter Rowles switched to playing rugby league in the mid-1970s, playing 2 seasons of reserve grade with Manly-Warringah before switching to play three seasons with the Western Suburbs Magpies in 1977, 1978 and 1980. In 1978 Rowles set the Western Suburbs club's record for most points in a season with 215 (8 tries, 94 goals, 3 field goals). He switched to Newtown Jets in 1979. Peter Rowles retired in 1981.

References

1952 births
Living people
Australia international rugby union players
Australian rugby league players
Australian rugby union players
Newtown Jets players
Rugby league players from Wollongong
Western Suburbs Magpies players
Rugby union fly-halves
Rugby union players from Wollongong